The Lumbardhi i Prizrenit or Prizren Bistrica (/ Prizrenska Bistrica) is a river in Kosovo. It flows through the villages of Sredska and Prizren, and empties into the White Drin river. It stems from the Sharr Mountains.

The most important tributaries of Prizren's Lumbardh are Shartica, Petroshnica, Drajçica, Lubinja, Jabllanica and Lumi i Manastirit.

Name 

The river's name, Lumbardh, literally translates to White River in Albanian. The adjective, i Prizrenit, differentiates it from the other Lumbardh tributaries of the White Drin in the Dukagjini area. 

The name Bistrica means "clearwater" in Serbian. The adjective Prizrenska, "of Prizren", is added to distinguish it from other Bistrica rivers in the Dukagjini region: Dečani Bistrica ("of Dečani"), Lumbardhi i Pejës ("of Peja/Peć"), Kožnjar Bistrica ("of Kožnjar"), Loćane Bistrica ("of Lloqan/Loćane"), etc.

See also
 Prizren
 White Drin
 Prizrenasja Hydro Power Plant Museum

Annotations

References

Rivers of Kosovo
Geography of Prizren District